Marrakesh, the regional capital, forms a prefecture-level administrative unit of Morocco, divided into Marrakesh-Medina, Marrakesh-Menara and Sidi Youssef Ben Ali, which form part of the region of Marrakesh-Tensift-El Haouz along with Al Haouz Province, Chichaoua Province, El Kelâat Es-Sraghna Province, and Essaouira Province.
In turn, the prefecture of Marrakech is divided administratively into the following:

Neighbourhoods of Marrakech
Neighbourhoods of the city include:
Bab Ghmat, Arset El Baraka, Arset Moulay Bouaza, Djane Ben Chogra, Arset El Houta, Bab Aylan, Arset Sidi Youssef, Derb Chtouka, Bab Hmar, Bab Agnaou, Quartier Jnan Laafia, Toureg, Kasbah, Mellah, Arset El Maach, Arset Moulay Moussa, Riad Zitoun Jdid, Kennaria, Rahba Kedima, Kaat Benahid, Zaouiat Lahdar, El Moukef, Riad Laarous, Assouel, Kechich, Douar Fekhara, Arset Tihiri, Sidi Ben Slimane El Jazouli, Diour Jdad, Rmila, Zaouia Sidi Rhalem, Kbour Chou, Ain Itti, Bab Doukkala, El Hara, and Arset El Bilk.

References

Marrakesh